IRVINE01 was a 1U CubeSat built by the Irvine CubeSat STEM Program (ICSP), a team of six high schools from Irvine, California. IRVINE01 was an educational mission that gives high school students the experience of building, testing, and controlling a nano-satellite, with the aim of developing interest and talent in the science and engineering fields.

IRVINE01 featured the first orbital ion electrospray thruster developed by Accion Systems. Other technologies aboard included deployable solar arrays and magnetorquers, both supplied by the Ecuadorian Civilian Space Agency.

IRVINE01 was launched from Rocket Lab Launch Complex 1 on November 11, 2018, as part of an Electron rocket mission operated by Rocket Lab entitled "It's Business Time".

IRVINE01 reentered the atmosphere on February 3, 2023.

See also
 IRVINE02

References

Education in Irvine, California
Satellites of the United States
Spacecraft launched in 2018
Spacecraft which reentered in 2023
2018 in the United States
CubeSats
Student satellites
Spacecraft launched by Electron rockets